Soli or SOLI may refer to:

Places
 Soli, Cyprus, an ancient city on the island of Cyprus
 Soli (Cilicia), an ancient city in Cilicia, later renamed Pompeiopolis, and the source of the word solecism
 Soli, Iran, a village in Gilan Province, Iran
 Soli (region), a 10th-century region that is today mostly Tuzla Canton, Bosnia and Herzegovina

Music
A series of compositions by the Mexican composer Carlos Chávez:
Soli I
Soli II
Soli III
Soli IV
 Soli, in music, a divided string section with only one player to a line, or an indication that the music is being performed by a soloist; See Solo (music)

Other uses
 Project Soli, a small radar chip made by Google's ATAP division to be used for gesture recognition
 Society of Our Lady of the Isles, an Anglican religious order of nuns in Scotland
 Sons of Liberty International, a self-described non-profit security contracting firm founded by Matthew VanDyke
 Soli language, a Bantu language of Zambia
 Soli people of Zambia

See also
 Solidaritätszuschlag (solidarity tax), a tax in Germany to pay for the development of former East Germany